The murder of Mona Tinsley is a British child murder case from 1937. On 5 January 1937, 10-year-old Mona Lilian Tinsley disappeared after leaving her Newark-on-Trent school. A former lodger of Mona's parents, Frederick Nodder, became the prime suspect in her abduction. However, despite the fact both strong physical and circumstantial evidence existed attesting to his guilt, because no body could be found, Nodder could not be tried for her murder, but was instead convicted of Mona's abduction and sentenced to seven years in gaol.

On 6 June, Mona's strangled body was recovered from the River Idle, and Nodder was subsequently charged with her murder. He was found guilty of Mona's murder and hanged at Lincoln Prison on 30 December 1937.

The murder of Mona Tinsley was a prime case study cited in English law as leading to the abolition of the no body, no murder principle. This principle was abolished in 1954. As such, a murder conviction can now be obtained based on circumstantial evidence, should this evidence be sufficiently compelling and convincing.

Disappearance and investigation
On the afternoon of Tuesday 5 January 1937, 10-year-old Mona Lilian Tinsley disappeared after leaving the Guildhall Street Methodist School in Newark-on-Trent. This school was approximately 20 minutes walk from Mona's Thoresby Road home, and she would typically arrive home at approximately 3.50 p.m. When Mona had not arrived home by 5 p.m., her father began visiting her friends' houses in the hope his daughter may be at one of these premises. That evening, Wilfred and Lilian Tinsley reported their daughter missing to the police, who promised to launch an intense manhunt for the child at daybreak. The following day, an intense search was mounted. This search involved canals and rivers being dragged, extensive door-to-door enquiries, and empty properties being searched. The police search was assisted by hundreds of local volunteers.

In response to extensive police and media appeals, two eyewitnesses came forward on 6 January to say they had seen the girl at a bus station in the company of a middle-aged man. One of these individuals was able to identify this man as a former lodger of the Tinsleys; the other eyewitness—a neighbour of Mona's—stated the man had been notably wary in demeanour. A neighbour of the Tinsley family also informed the police that she had seen this former lodger of the theirs standing alone, loitering on a street corner close to Mona's school, staring in the direction of the entrance to the premises on the afternoon of her abduction. Later that day, a bus conductor named Charles Reville confirmed to police that the previous day, a young girl matching Mona's description had indeed boarded his 4.45 p.m. bus from Newark to Retford in the company of a middle-aged man, and the pair had alighted his bus at Grove Street, Retford. Reville ominously added that this man had purchased a return ticket for himself, but only a single half-fare ticket for the girl. Reville's claims were independently substantiated by a passenger on the bus named Stanley Betts, who also claimed to have seen a middle-aged man travelling between Newark and Retford with a girl matching Mona's description.

Mona's parents were questioned by the police in relation to these eyewitness statements. They gave this former lodger's name as Frederick Hudson, adding that they had been introduced to Hudson by Lilian's sister, Edith Grimes, with whom Hudson had previously lodged in Sheffield. The Tinsleys explained that after Hudson left the Grimes household in October 1935, he had briefly lodged with them, but that they had evicted him from their home after just three weeks for non-payment of rent. Nonetheless, Wilfred and Lilian Tinsley emphasised that his departure from their household had been upon amicable terms, and also confirmed that in the short space of time Hudson had lodged in their household, he had been popular with their seven children, who had all come to know him as "Uncle Fred".

Police interviewed Edith Grimes, who stated the man her sister knew as Frederick Hudson was actually a 49-year-old named Frederick Nodder, who had adopted the surname Hudson as an alias, since becoming the subject of an affiliation order. Grimes described Nodder as being a brutish and squalid drunkard with poor personal hygiene and few friends, who worked primarily as a motor mechanic and lorry driver in Retford. Nodder had, Grimes stated, deserted his wife many years before he had lodged with them. However, she claimed to be unaware of his current address, and to have not seen him for several months (this claim was contradicted by a neighbour of the Grimes family, who recalled seeing a lorry driver fitting Nodder's description at their home shortly after Christmas 1936). Enquiries in public houses and garages in Retford quickly led officers to the Retford haulage firm with which Nodder was employed; this firm was able to provide police with Nodder's current address on Smeath Road in the Nottinghamshire village of Hayton.

Formal questioning
In the late evening of 6 January, police questioned Frederick Nodder at his rented home. Producing a photograph of Mona and asking if he knew the child, Nodder confirmed he did indeed "used to" know her, but claimed not to have seen Mona for approximately 15 months, following his eviction from the Tinsley household. Questioned as to his movements the previous day, Nodder confirmed he had indeed been in Newark on 5 January, but claimed that he had simply been looking for work. He further claimed to have returned to Retford alone on the 3.45 p.m. bus (approximately 10 minutes before Mona is believed to have been abducted).

As police questioned Nodder, other officers began interviewing his neighbours. One of these neighbours claimed to police she had seen a young girl matching Mona's description at Nodder's premises earlier that day; another neighbour was able to confirm to police that at midday on 6 January, a young brunette girl wearing a blue dress had been standing in the back doorway of his house, watching Nodder digging in his garden. This combination of eyewitness testimony was enough to detain Nodder, and at 11 p.m. that evening, he was arrested on a bastardy warrant (police having learned from Edith Grimes that Nodder had been the subject of an affiliation order), and both his home (known as "Peacehaven") and garden extensively searched. Every house, drain, ditch and cesspit within a three-mile radius of Nodder's property was also searched, and a five-mile stretch of the Chesterfield Canal was also drained. Although the search outside the grounds of Peacehaven proved fruitless insofar as discovering Mona either alive or dead, the search of Nodder's property revealed a handkerchief later determined as having belonged to Mona near a water tank at the rear of the premises. Also discovered inside the house were scraps of paper depicting a child's drawings and writings, and fingerprints upon crockery in the kitchen were quickly matched to those taken from materials Mona was known to have handled at her home. Ominously, an opened packet of sweets, two soiled handkerchiefs, and a tin of Vaseline were discovered beneath a pillow in the front bedroom of these premises, indicating a likely sexual motive for the child's abduction.

The following morning, Nodder was placed in an identity parade, and each of the witnesses who had seen Mona on 5 and 6 January did not hesitate to pick him out as the man they had seen in her company. Confronted with both these positive identifications and the successive pieces of evidence being discovered at his home, Nodder changed his story as to his actions on 5 January. In his initial statement, given on the evening of 8 January, Nodder claimed he had encountered Mona by chance outside her school, and that upon her recognising him, Mona had cheerfully exclaimed, "Hullo, Uncle Fred!" before asking him to take her to visit her aunt (Edith Grimes) in Sheffield in order that she could see her newborn cousin, whom she had not yet seen. Reluctantly, he had agreed to Mona's request, as he had expected to see Mrs. Grimes the following day (the pair having an agreement to meet once a week in their affair). He had therefore persuaded Mona to spend the evening at his home, before giving the child two shillings and placing her on a bus to Sheffield the following evening, with instructions—both verbal and written—as to how to reach her aunt's home, and a note of explanation for her visit to Mrs. Grimes. This arrangement would therefore ensure Nodder's home was empty when Mrs. Grimes visited him at their pre-scheduled meeting time. Nodder further stated Edith Grimes could assist police with their investigation; adding she had known his address but alleging she had withheld this information from the police.

Although the extensive searches conducted in and around Newark, Sheffield and Hayton had failed to find any trace of Mona, on 10 January 1937, Nodder was charged with Mona's abduction (the lack of a body precluding a formal charge of murder). In response, Nodder proclaimed, "I didn't take her away by force!"

Assistance of Scotland Yard
Although Nodder refused to divulge the whereabouts of Mona's body, police were certain the child was dead. Following the completion of the search of Peacehaven and the vicinity of the premises, police—again assisted by hundreds of volunteers and several search dogs—expanded the search radius for Mona's body to the surrounding countryside. Both local and national media devoted extensive coverage pertaining to the investigation, publishing a photograph and physical description of the child and appealing for assistance from the public.

After three weeks, the Chief Constable of Newark, Harry Barnes, decided to seek the assistance of Scotland Yard. On 25 January, Chief Inspector Leonard Burt and a Detective Sergeant Skardon arrived in Hayton, and the two immediately organised an extensive search of every house, drain, ditch and pond within three miles of Peacehaven. This search was at the time one of the most extensive in British police history, although it would ultimately prove fruitless. Before Chief Inspector Burt and his colleague left Hayton, they informed their counterparts of their conviction Mona's body had been thrown into the River Idle, and of their fears the child's body may have been swept into the North Sea.

Medium assistance
Just days after the disappearance of Mona Tinsley, a renowned spiritualist medium named Estelle Roberts contacted the Chief Constable of Newark, offering her assistance in locating the child upon the condition her involvement remained confidential and adding that if the chief constable accepted her services and conditions, to mail her some clothing the child had worn. With the agreement of Mona's parents, police sought Roberts' assistance.

Upon handling a pink silk dress the child had worn shortly before her disappearance, Roberts immediately knew the child was dead. She later informed police Mona had been murdered, adding that she had taken to a house with a water-filled ditch on one side, and that she had spent much of her time within this household copying "something out of a book" (police had not informed Roberts of the scraps of children's drawings or writings discovered at Peacehaven). Roberts stated the child had been strangled to death in an upstairs bedroom of these premises, before her murderer had placed her body in a sack and transported her remains to a river beyond the field which existed behind this house. Roberts then informed the police, "You will find the child's body there".

First trial
On 9 and 10 March 1937, Nodder appeared at Birmingham Assizes. He was tried before Mr. Justice Swift, charged with Mona's abduction; the taking of the girl by fraud with the intent of depriving her father of possession of her; of detaining her by fraud; of decoying and enticing her into his possession; and of unlawfully stealing and carrying away the child and secreting her against the wishes of her father.

The prosecution was conducted by Norman Birkett KC, who could only argue that Nodder had abducted the child. Nodder chose not to testify at this hearing, leaving his defence counsel, led by Maurice Healy, to reiterate Nodder's claims that Mona had spent one night at his Peacehaven home before he had given the child two shillings and both verbal and written instructions as to how to travel to her aunt's Sheffield home, and that he had not seen her since. Healy further argued that Mona may still be found alive and well, and that no-one should speculate as to her actual fate.

The jury took just 16 minutes to convict Nodder of Tinsley's abduction. In his summary to the court, Justice Swift paid reference to Nodder's refusal to testify at this trial, stating: "Nobody knows what has become of that little girl... Whatever happened to her, how she fared, who looked after her, where she slept. There is one person in this court who knows, and he is silent... he is silent! He says nothing to you at all... He sits there and never tells you a word." In passing sentence, Justice Swift added: "What you did with that little girl, what became of her, only you know. It may be that time will reveal the dreadful secret you carry in your breast. I cannot tell, but, I am determined that, as far as I have part or lot in that dreadful tragedy of 5 January and 6 January, I will keep you in custody." He was sentenced to seven years' imprisonment, to be served at Lincoln Prison.

Body discovery

On 6 June 1937, a family boating on the River Idle in Bawtry spotted an object in the water, close to the bank. Upon closer inspection, this family discovered that the object was the partially decomposed body of a child, with the head and upper torso embedded in silt and trapped in a drain below water level. Her body had been weighted down with wood and metal, with only the lower trunk floating above the surface of the water. On the banks of the river was a torn and rotting sack which had evidently been used to transport the child's body. The following day, an underwater search unit would discover a child's coat and wellington boot. The location of these discoveries was approximately eight miles from where Nodder had lived.

The child's body was initially moved to a nearby inn, where the clothing present with the body was identified by Wilfred Tinsley as belonging to his daughter. A subsequent autopsy at the Retford Mortuary confirmed Mona had been strangled—most likely with a ligature—and that she had been dead before entering the water. Due to the extensive period of time the body had been in the river, the extensive adipocere formation upon the corpse prevented the pathologist from being able to determine whether Mona had been sexually assaulted before her murder, although deep bite marks resultant from her strangulation were still evident upon her tongue.

The funeral of Mona Tinsley took place on 10 June 1937 at her local Methodist Church, where Mona had attended Sunday School. Several hundred people lined the streets as her coffin was led from the Methodist Church to Newark Cemetery, where her body was interred. On 28 June, Frederick Nodder was formally charged by a Superintendent Burkitt of having committed the murder with malice aforethought of Mona Lilian Tinsley.

Second trial
Five months after Nodder had been formally charged with the murder of Mona Tinsley, he appeared at Nottingham Assizes to be tried for her murder. This second trial began on 22 November 1937, and again saw Norman Birkett appear on behalf of the prosecution, and Maurice Healy on behalf of the defence. Healy again argued his client had no actual motive to commit the murder and advanced the theory that Mona had been abducted by another unknown individual while travelling alone to Sheffield and that this individual had committed the murder.

Nodder himself testified at this second trial. He reiterated his previous claims that he had not seen Mona after he had placed her on a bus at Worksop with view to her visiting her aunt in Sheffield. In response to questioning from both the prosecution and defence, Nodder denied killing the child; adhering to his defence counsel's allegation that she had been murdered by an unknown individual after he had last seen her on 6 January.

Among the many prosecution witnesses to testify was the bus conductor, Charles Reville, who testified that a young girl matching Mona's description had boarded his bus in the company of a man whom he positively identified as Frederick Nodder, and that Nodder had purchased a return ticket for himself, but only a single ticket for the girl. Also to testify at this second trial was Sir Bernard Spilsbury, who testified that Mona had been strangled from behind with a ligature such as a bootlace or a cord of similar diameter to a bootlace which had been drawn behind her head, then tightened. Spilsbury further testified that the deep bite marks still evident upon Mona's tongue at the time of the discovery of her body indicated the child had bitten her tongue for an extended period of time as this act of strangulation had occurred.
.

This second trial lasted just two days, although the jury took just 75 minutes to find Nodder guilty. When given the opportunity to speak after hearing the jury's verdict, Nodder stood before the judge, before declaring in a low but firm tone: "I shall go out of this court with a clear conscience." In passing the death sentence, the presiding judge, Mr. Justice Macnaghten, informed Nodder: "Justice has slowly, but surely, overtaken you, and it only remains for me to pronounce the sentence which the law and justice require." Nodder smiled as he heard Mr. Justice Macnaghten pass this death sentence.

Execution
Frederick Nodder never formally confessed to Mona's murder. He did launch an appeal against his sentence, contending that the evidence presented against him at his trial was purely circumstantial, and not conclusive of guilt. His appeal was heard on 13 December before three judges in the Court of Appeal, but was dismissed on the same day. He was hanged at Lincoln Prison at 8 a.m. on the morning of 30 December 1937. His executioners were Tom Pierrepoint and Stanley Cross.

See also

 Capital punishment in the United Kingdom
 Child abduction
 Child Abuse
 Child Sexual Abuse
 HM Prison Lincoln
 List of executioners
 List of solved missing person cases
 Murder conviction without a body

Notes

References

Cited works and further reading

External links 
 British Executions case file pertaining to Frederick Nodder
 Contemporary news article covering the second trial of Frederick Nodder
 External website detailing the murder of Mona Tinsley

1930s missing person cases
1937 in England
1937 murders in the United Kingdom
Child sexual abuse in England
Child sexual abuse in the United Kingdom
Deaths by person in England
Female murder victims
Formerly missing people
Incidents of violence against girls
January 1937 events
Missing person cases in England
Murder in England
People executed by the United Kingdom by hanging